Megerdich I (? – died 1894), was Catholicos of Cilicia of the Holy See of Cilicia of the Armenian Apostolic Church from 1871 to 1894.

After his death, the position of catholicos remained vacant for 8 years (1894-1902), until the election of Sahag II of Cilicia.

Catholicoi of Cilicia
1894 deaths
Armenian Oriental Orthodox Christians
Armenians from the Ottoman Empire
Year of birth unknown